Battle Dice is a dice game that uses small figures which represent superheroes that are placed inside a die, and then rolled. It was created by Genie Toys and licensed to Playmates Toys and it began with the majority of the superheroes and supervillains from Marvel in 2006.

Marvel Battle Dice

Purchasing
The figures can be purchased in booster packs or in starter sets. The booster packs contain 3 random battle figures and one battle die. The starter set comes with 6 figures (two of which are secret). There are also battle dice launchers, which are large sized versions of the Thing and the Hulk.

The Game
The game works by placing the figures (approximately 1" inch) in the battle dice, which have certain attributes by popping the dice open. When the dice are rolled, the player with the lower dice roll goes first. They select an attribute on the character, and use them to battle the other figure(s). Then the attributes take place, and so on and so forth, and the player with a certain roll wins, etc. Currently, there are 23 different dice. The attributes are measured on a 0-6 scale, 6 being the highest; those attributes are: Intelligence, Strength, Speed, Durability, Energy, and Fighting Skills. Characters are ranked points; in most tournaments teams cannot exceed 30 points, making figures like the powerful Dark Phoenix too expensive to use. A comprehensive explanation can be found at any of the first two links in the links section.

The Production Run
On September 12, 2006 Playmates Toys officially announced that the game would no longer be supported. The official site announced that the company would be turning its attention away from the game. Series 2 figures although announced for release no longer have an official release date and may never ship. The game received quite a few reviews all of which were above average. And an official reason has not been given as to the end of this games production.

Tournament vouchers should be honored until the beginning of December 2006. After that time they will return any further vouchers un-opened. The first official tournament was held in Sandy Utah on May 20, 2006. The last official tournament has not been revealed.

Set 1
In January 2006, Playmates Toys released the first set consisting of 68 characters, which are:
001 - Captain America
002 - Captain America (Transparent)
003 - Hawkeye
004 - Human Torch
005 - Invisible Woman
006 - Iron Man
007 - Mr. Fantastic
008 - She-Hulk
009 - Silver Surfer
010 - The Thing
011 - The Thing (Transparent)
012 - Thor
013 - AIM agent
014 - Annihilus
015 - Baron Zemo
016 - Dr. Doom
017 - Loki
018 - Mole Man
019 - Red Skull
020 - Super-Skrull
021 - Thanos
022 - Ultron (Transparent)
023 - Ultron
024 - Black Cat
025 - Black Spidey
026 - Daredevil
027 - Doctor Strange
028 - Elektra
029 - Ghost Rider
030 - Nick Fury
031 - Punisher
032 - Spider-Man
033 - Spider-Man (Transparent)
034 - The Hulk
035 - The Hulk (Transparent)
036 - Abomination
037 - Blackheart
038 - Bullseye
039 - Carnage
040 - Doc Ock
041 - Doc Ock (Transparent)
042 - Hobgoblin
043 - Mysterio
044 - Rhino
045 - Venom
046 - Vulture
047 - Archangel

048 - Banshee
049 - Beast
050 - Cyclops
051 - Gambit
052 - Kitty Pryde
053 - Nightcrawler
054 - Professor X
055 - Psylocke
056 - Wolverine
057 - Wolverine (Transparent)
058 - Apocalypse
059 - Dark Phoenix
060 - Deadpool
061 - Magneto
062 - Magneto (Transparent)
063 - Mimic
064 - Mojo
065 - Mystique
066 - Sabretooth
067 - Sentinel
068 - Toad
069 - Wolverine (Stealth)

There are also "Clear" forms of Wolverine, Spider-Man, Magneto, Captain America, the Thing, Doc Ock, Ultron and the Hulk that "re-arrange" their abilities. Three characters were left out of production and are currently tournament prizes: She-Hulk, Silver Surfer and Red Skull.

Set 2
Originally slated for a July 2006 release, Playmates Toys was to have released the second series of Marvel Battle Dice. This set would have included these characters:
Storm
Phoenix
Galactus
Pyro
Franklin Richards
Green Goblin
Scarlet Spider
Vengeance
Scarlet Witch
Colossus
Kraven the Hunter
Mister Sinister
Vision
Mandarin
Blob
Ezekiel
Sentry
Black Panther
Iron Fist
Kang
Modok
Juggernaut
Omega Red
Electro
Kingpin
Mephisto
Wasp

DC Battle Dice
The first DC set of Battle Dice was to have been released in the fall of 2006 and was to include characters like Superman, Batman, Wonder Woman, Raven, Starfire, etc.

The "Death" of Battle Dice
Shortly after their promotional tour of the game, Playmates suddenly pulled their support of Battle Dice. Their own site for the game was deactivated shortly thereafter, leaving the future of the game—not to mention the two above-mentioned expansions—rather nebulous.

Fan support of the game, though scattered, still remains. The link below is one of the very few such fan sites for the game that is regularly maintained.

See also
Game design

Dice games
Works based on Marvel Comics